The Casio F-91W is a digital watch manufactured by Japanese electronics company Casio. Introduced in 1989 as a successor of the F-87W, it is popular for its low price and long battery life. As of 2011, annual production of the watch is 3 million units, which makes it the most sold watch in the world. Its ubiquitous use in the construction of timers for terrorist bombs prompted US officials to view the wearing of these watches as a "sign of al-Qaeda".

Specifications

Design 

Designed by Ryusuke Moriai as his first design for Casio, the case of the F-91W measures . The case is primarily made of resin, with a stainless steel caseback and buttons with the manufacturer's module number, 593, stamped on the caseback.

Features 
The F-91W is a chronograph, featuring a  second stopwatch with a count up to 59:59.99 (nearly one hour). The stopwatch also has the feature to mark net and split time (lap). Other features include an hourly time beep and a single daily alarm lasting 20 seconds and an annual calendar, with adjustment for leap years not supported as the watch does not record the year. February is always counted as 28 days. The watch uses a faint, green LED backlight located to the left of the display for illumination (in earlier versions it was an amber microlight). According to manufacturer estimates, the watch is reported to be accurate to ±30 seconds per month.

The quartz movement, designated Module 593, is powered by a single CR2016 3-volt lithium button cell.

Water resistance 

The watch front is marked "Water Resist", but Casio reports different values for different variants of the watch. The black version (F91W-1) is "30 meter / 3 bar" (i.e. 100 feet / 44 psi), the ISO standard meaning of which is: "Suitable for everyday use. Splash/rain resistant. NOT suitable for showering, bathing, swimming, snorkeling, water related work and fishing".

Operation 

The watch is controlled by three side-mounted push-buttons. 
The upper left button, labeled "Light", turns on the light, cancels the alarm, resets the stopwatch or marks the split (lap) time, and is used for selecting settings. 
The lower left button, labeled "Mode", cycles the modes of the watch: time display, alarm, stopwatch, and time/date adjustment. 
The right button, labeled "Alarm On-Off/24hr", is the function button: when used, it starts and stops the stopwatch, changes the settings currently being adjusted, or switches between the 12- and 24-hour modes, depending on what mode the watch is currently in. Pressing all three buttons at the same time will fill all the cells on the LCD until any button is pressed again.

The time or date is adjusted by pressing the lower left button three times to bring the watch to time adjustment mode. The top left button is used to cycle through seconds, hours, minutes, month, date, day, and normal mode. The right button is used to adjust the flashing value displayed. Unlike any other value, the seconds can only be zeroed. Should this happen before 30 seconds, the watch will zero in at the beginning of the current minute. After 30 seconds it will start the next minute as displayed. When the adjustments are finished, the bottom left button can be pressed once to return the watch to normal mode.

The watch display shows the day of the week, day of the month, hour, minute, seconds, and the signs PM in the afternoon – or 24H (24-hour clock) – at all times, the alarm signal status (bar of vertical lines), and the hourly signal status (double beep on the hour, shown as a bell) are present when activated in the alarm mode.

In stopwatch mode, minutes, seconds, and hundredths of a second are shown.

Usage in terrorism 

According to secret documents issued to interrogators at Guantanamo Bay, obtained and released by The Guardian, "the Casio F-91W digital watch was declared to be 'the sign of al-Qaeda' and a contributing factor to continued detention of prisoners by the analysts stationed at Guantanamo Bay. Briefing documents used to train staff in assessing the threat level of new detainees advise that possession of the F-91W and the A159W – available online for as little as £4 – suggests the wearer has been trained in bomb making by al-Qaeda in Afghanistan." United States military intelligence officials have identified the F-91W as a watch that terrorists use in constructing time bombs.

This association was highlighted in the Denbeaux study, and may have been used in some cases at Guantanamo Bay. An article published in The Washington Post in 1996 reported that Abdul Hakim Murad, Wali Khan Amin Shah, and Ramzi Ahmed Yousef had developed techniques to use commonly available Casio digital watches to detonate time bombs. Casio watches were mentioned almost 150 times in prisoner assessments from Guantanamo.

On July 12, 2006, the magazine Mother Jones provided excerpts from the transcripts of a selection of the Guantanamo detainees.
The article informed readers:

More than a dozen detainees were cited for owning cheap digital watches, particularly "the infamous Casio watch of the type used by Al Qaeda members for bomb detonators."

The article quoted Abdullah Kamel Abdullah Kamel Al Kandari:

When they told me that Casios were used by Al Qaeda and the watch was for explosives, I was shocked... If I had known that, I would have thrown it away. I'm not stupid. We have four chaplains [at Guantanamo]; all of them wear this watch.

Variants

Counterfeits 

Counterfeits of this watch are very common, despite its low price tag. These counterfeits generally have a lower plastic build quality, narrower LCD viewing angles, louder and higher-pitched beeps, and significantly less accurate timekeeping than genuine models. The newer modules with the green LED light can be tested by holding the right button for over 3 seconds in the main timekeeping mode; this will lead the display to show "CASIo", as a test for authenticity. With the advancement in technology, however, some counterfeit models have also been developed to show this sign, although these are fairly uncommon. This leaves the only method of distinguishing them as assessing the overall build quality, timekeeping accuracy, display viewing angle and the printing on the screen.

References

External links 
 
 F91W-1 product page, Casio website

F91W
Products introduced in 1989